Melanis cinaron, the orange-bordered pixie, is a species in the butterfly family Riodinidae.

Description
The upperside of the wings is black with an orange border on the hindwings. The larvae feed on the leaves of Fabaceae species.

Distribution and habitat
This species is present in Colombia, northern Brazil, Ecuador and Peru.

References

Riodininae
Riodinidae of South America
Butterflies described in 1861
Taxa named by Baron Cajetan von Felder
Taxa named by Rudolf Felder